Cléber Antonio de Andrade (born 14 June 1994) is a Brazilian handball player for HC Taubaté and the Brazilian national team.

He participated at the 2021 World Men's Handball Championship.

Titles
Pan American Men's Club Handball Championship:
2013,2014,2015,2016,2018
South and Central American Men's Club Handball Championship:2019, 2022''

References

1994 births
Living people
Brazilian male handball players
21st-century Brazilian people